The Netherlands participated in the inaugural Paralympic Games in 1960 in Rome, where it sent a delegation of five athletes. The country has participated in every subsequent edition of the Summer Paralympics. It made its Winter Paralympics début in 1984, and has taken part in every subsequent edition of the Games, except 2006. The Netherlands was the host country of the 1980 Summer Paralympics, in Arnhem.

Dutch athletes have won a total of 622 Paralympic medals, of which 239 gold, 208 silver and 175 bronze. 612 of these medals (including 237 of the gold) were won at the Summer Paralympics. This places the Netherlands ninth on the all-time Paralympic Games medal table - behind the United States, Great Britain, Canada, France, Australia, Germany, Austria and Poland.

The Netherlands’ most successful Games, in terms of ranking, were the 1976 Summer Games in Toronto, when it finished second (behind the United States). Numerically, the country won most medals at the 1984 Summer Games in New York City and Stoke Mandeville: 135 medals, of which 55 gold. The Netherlands consistently ranked in the top ten until 1996, included. Since then, they have experienced something of a decline. The 2004 Games marked the first time since 1964 that the Dutch had failed to win at least ten gold medals; they won five, and ranked at an all-time low of 27th.

Prior to 2014, Marjorie van de Bunt was the only Dutch athlete to have won medals at the Winter Paralympics. She won a gold in biathlon and three bronze in cross-country skiing in 1994, then a silver and a bronze in 1998, and a gold (in biathlon) and three silver (in cross-country skiing) in 2002. She has not competed again at the Paralympics since that date. The Netherlands were absent from the 2006 Games, and sent only a one-man delegation (Kees-Jan van der Klooster) to compete in alpine skiing in 2010; he did not win any medals. In 2014, flag-bearer Bibian Mentel took a gold medal in snowboarding.

Medals

Summer Paralympics

Winter Paralympics

Medals by summer sport

Medals by winter sport

List of medalists

Summer Paralympics

Winter Paralympics

See also
 Netherlands at the Olympics

References